The 1982 NBA playoffs were the postseason tournament of the National Basketball Association's 1981–82 season. The tournament concluded with the Western Conference champion Los Angeles Lakers defeating the Eastern Conference champion Philadelphia 76ers 4 games to 2 in the NBA Finals. Magic Johnson was named NBA Finals MVP for the second time.

It was the second NBA Finals meeting in three years between the Lakers and Sixers, and ended with the same result—a 4–2 Lakers victory—as the previous confrontation. They met again in 1983, with Philadelphia getting revenge in a sweep. The Sixers beat the Celtics again in the Eastern Conference Finals, the second of their three series wins in a four-year stretch.

The Bullets' 2-0 sweep of the Nets was their last playoff series victory until 2005.

This was the third straight year the Bucks failed to advance to the third round with the #2 seed despite a first-round bye, although they did not have the better record in each of those matchups, and thus not having home-court advantage.

Bracket

First round

Eastern Conference first round

(3) Philadelphia 76ers vs. (6) Atlanta Hawks

This was the second playoff meeting between these two teams, with the 76ers winning the first meeting.

(4) New Jersey Nets vs. (5) Washington Bullets

This was the first playoff meeting between the Nets and the Bullets.

Western Conference first round

(3) Seattle SuperSonics vs. (6) Houston Rockets

This was the first playoff meeting between the Rockets and the SuperSonics.

(4) Denver Nuggets vs. (5) Phoenix Suns

This was the first playoff meeting between the Nuggets and the Suns.

Conference semifinals

Eastern Conference semifinals

(1) Boston Celtics vs. (5) Washington Bullets

 Frank Johnson hits the game-winning 3 pointer with 3 seconds left.

 Jeff Ruland hits the game-tying free throws with 24 seconds left to force OT.

This was the second playoff meeting between these two teams, with the Bullets winning the first meeting.

(2) Milwaukee Bucks vs. (3) Philadelphia 76ers

 Sidney Moncrief hits the game-winning buzzer beater.

This was the third playoff meeting between these two teams, with each team winning one series apiece.

Western Conference semifinals

(1) Los Angeles Lakers vs. (5) Phoenix Suns

This was the third playoff meeting between these two teams, with the Lakers winning the first two meetings.

(2) San Antonio Spurs vs. (3) Seattle SuperSonics

This was the first playoff meeting between the Spurs and the SuperSonics.

Conference finals

Eastern Conference finals

(1) Boston Celtics vs. (3) Philadelphia 76ers

 Mother's Day Massacre

 The Celtics were not able to overcome a 3–1 series deficit twice in a row, losing Game 7 at home. The Sixers became the 2nd team to ever beat the Celtics in a Game 7 in the Garden (after the New York Knicks did in 1973) and the 3rd NBA road team to win Game 7 after leading series 3–1. The Boston Garden crowd in Game 7 chanted "Beat LA! Beat LA!" to the victorious Sixers.

This was the 17th playoff meeting between these two teams, with the Celtics winning nine of the first 16 meetings.

Western Conference finals

(1) Los Angeles Lakers vs. (2) San Antonio Spurs

This was the first playoff meeting between the Lakers and the Spurs.

NBA Finals: (E3) Philadelphia 76ers vs. (W1) Los Angeles Lakers

This was the fourth playoff meeting between these two teams, with the Lakers winning the first three meetings.

References

External links
Basketball-Reference.com's 1982 NBA Playoffs page

National Basketball Association playoffs
Playoffs

fi:NBA-kausi 1981–1982#Pudotuspelit